Esfian (also Romanized as Esfīān, Esfeyān, and Esfīyān) is a village in Komehr Rural District, in the Central District of Sepidan County, Fars Province, Iran. At the 2006 census, its population was 683, in 146 families.

References 

Populated places in Sepidan County